Eric Scott Melvin (born July 9, 1966) is an American musician and founding member of the punk rock band NOFX.

Melvin sings backup vocals on most NOFX songs and wrote the guitar riffs for NOFX songs such as the intro for "Leave It Alone". His vocal style is iconically called the "Mel Yell".

He is also a founding member of Punk Rock Karaoke with Steve Soto and Greg Hetson, though he rarely performs with them. Melvin is an irregular touring member of Me First and the Gimme Gimmes playing bass when Fat Mike was not available.

Personal life
Melvin is of Ukrainian and Jewish descent and grew up in Hollywood.

According to the bands autobiography, Melvin was engaged to the singer of a band that also played the Warped Tour in the late 1990s. While Melvin changed both the name of his former fiancee as well as her band for the book,  it is heavily implied by all the other details - 1998's Warped Tour, her band being a ska band, bright red hair - to be Monique Powell of Save Ferris.

In 2016 Melvin married Australian born artist Sarah Melvin and they have identical twin daughters together: Ivy Laine Melvin and Phaedra Rose Melvin, born 21 minutes apart. Melvin has two boys, Eli Melvin & Caspian Melvin and lives with his wife Sarah and all 4 children in the Encinitas area of Southern California.

He was raised Jewish, but also relates to Buddhism & Taoism. He also practices meditation and yoga.

Albums with NOFX
1985 Maximum Rocknroll
1988 Liberal Animation
1989 S&M Airlines
1991 Ribbed
1992 The Longest Line
1992 White Trash, Two Heebs and a Bean
1994 Punk in Drublic
1995 I Heard They Suck Live!!
1996 Heavy Petting Zoo
1997 So Long and Thanks for All the Shoes
1999 The Decline
2000 Pump Up the Valuum
2002 45 or 46 Songs That Weren't Good Enough To Go On Our Other Records
2003 The War on Errorism
2006 Never Trust a Hippy
2006 Wolves in Wolves' Clothing
2007 They've Actually Gotten Worse Live!
2009 Coaster
2009 Cokie the Clown
2012 Self Entitled
2013 Stoke Extinguisher
2014 Backstage Passport Soundtrack
2016 First Ditch Effort
2018 Ribbed: Live in a Dive
2021 Single Album
2022 Double Album

References

External links
NOFX official website

1966 births
Living people
American punk rock guitarists
Jewish American musicians
Jews in punk rock
American male singers
American punk rock singers
American male guitarists
20th-century American guitarists
NOFX members
Punk Rock Karaoke members